Muhammad Safiullah Khan Tanoli , was an officer of the British army who worked with Henry Rawlinson, 1st Baron Rawlinson and served as Minister of Defence of the Nawab of Amb.

He fought in the Battle of Chamla and in the Indo-Pakistani War of 1947–1948. He was the grandson of Maddad Khan Tanoli.

Personal life 
He was the son of Hussain Khan Tanoli and grandson of Maddad Khan Tanoli. He spent his young life in France, Germany and London. He served his military career in the British Raj. Muhammad Khan Zaman Khan called him to return and help in the Battle of Chamla. 
He also worked with Syed Abdul Jabbar Shah. He controlled police stations of all Darband, Amb. He was also known as Afsar-e-Darband. (افسردربند).

References

1974 deaths
Indian politicians
1889 births